Christopher J. Wiernicki (born September 29, 1958) is a naval architect, engineer, and businessperson. He is the chair, president, and CEO of American Bureau of Shipping, an international classification organization, and also serves as Chairman of ABS Group of Companies, a global risk consulting and technical services company. He is a serving member of the President’s National Infrastructure Advisory Council (NIAC).

Career
Wiernicki obtained his BS degree in civil engineering from Vanderbilt University, an MS degree in structural engineering from George Washington University, and an MS degree in ocean engineering from the Massachusetts Institute of Technology. He also completed the Harvard Business School Advanced Management Program.

Prior to joining ABS in 1993, Wiernicki was President and CEO of Designers and Planners Inc., a naval architecture firm.

In 2013, Wiernicki was inducted into the George Washington University School of Engineering and Applied Science Hall of Fame. He received The Vice Admiral Emory S. "Jerry" Land Medal from the Society of Naval Architects and Marine Engineers for Outstanding Accomplishment in the Marine Field. In 2016, Wiernicki was inducted into the International Maritime Hall of Fame and received the Admiral of the Ocean Seas Award from the United Seamen's Service. He has been awarded honorary Doctor of Science degrees from Maine Maritime Academy and State University of New York Maritime College. Wiernicki served as Chairman of Council of the International Association of Classification Societies from 2015 to 2016. In 2017, Wiernicki was inducted to the Vanderbilt University School of Engineering Academy of Distinguished Alumni, named to the Vanderbilt University School of Engineering's Board of Visitors, conferred an honorary Doctor of Engineering degree from Stevens Institute of Technology, and named the Massachusetts Maritime Academy’s Person of the Year. In 2018, he was recognized as one of the top 50 influential people in the tanker shipping and trade industry by Tanker Shipping & Trade and was named the International Personality of the Year at the annual Greek Shipping Awards. On June 20, 2020, Wiernicki was the Distinguished Industry Speaker at the U.S. Merchant Marine Academy's Commencement Ceremony for the Class of 2020. In January 2021, he was elected to the U.S. National Academy of Engineering for innovations in the design, engineering, and operation of ships and offshore structures. In August 2022, he was appointed by President Biden to the President’s National Infrastructure Advisory Council, which advises the White House on how to reduce risks and improve the resilience of the nation’s critical infrastructure sectors.

References

American naval architects
Living people
1958 births
21st-century American engineers
Vanderbilt University alumni
George Washington University School of Engineering and Applied Science alumni
MIT School of Engineering alumni